Sabbir Hossain (born 15 March 1997) is a Bangladeshi cricketer. He made his List A debut for Partex Sporting Club in the 2016–17 Dhaka Premier Division Cricket League on 17 April 2017. He made his first-class debut for Rajshahi Division in the 2017–18 National Cricket League on 6 October 2017. He made his Twenty20 debut for Shinepukur Cricket Club in the 2018–19 Dhaka Premier Division Twenty20 Cricket League on 25 February 2019.

References

External links
 

1997 births
Living people
Bangladeshi cricketers
Partex Sporting Club cricketers
Rajshahi Division cricketers
Shinepukur Cricket Club cricketers
Place of birth missing (living people)